Spyridium subochreatum is a species of flowering plant in the family Rhamnaceae and is endemic to southern continental Australia. It is a low shrub with linear to oblong or narrowly egg-shaped leaves, and dense clusters of creamy-white flowers with dark brown, papery bracts at the base.

Description
The edges of the leaves are sometimes rolled under, concealing the densely softly-hairy lower surface. The flowers are arranged in dense heads near the ends of branches surrounded at the base by several dark brown, papery bracts.

Taxonomy
This species was first formally described in 1855 by Ferdinand von Mueller who gave it the name Trymalium subochreatum in his book Definitions of rare or hitherto undescribed Australian plants. In 1858, Siegfried Reissek changed the name to Spyridium subochreatum in the journal Linnaea. The specific epithet (subochreatum) means "almost protected by greaves or leggings".

Distribution and habitat
Spyridium subochreatum grows in mallee-heath on sand dunes and is widespread and common in north-western Victoria and south-eastern South Australia. It also occurs in the Esperance Plains and Mallee bioregions of southern Western Australia.

References

subochreatum
Rosales of Australia
Flora of South Australia
Flora of Western Australia
Flora of Victoria (Australia)
Taxa named by Ferdinand von Mueller
Plants described in 1855